Saltmarsh rush or salt marsh rush is a common name for several plants and may refer to:

Juncus gerardii, native to the Northern North America and Europe
Juncus kraussii, native to the Southern hemisphere
Juncus roemerianus, native to the Southeastern United States and Caribbean